Lyndwood is a place located in Luzerne County, Pennsylvania in the United States of America. Its latitude is 41°14'5" North; longitude is  75°55'55" West.

Geography of Luzerne County, Pennsylvania